Roope Juhani Latvala (born 25 June 1970) is a Finnish guitarist, best known as the former rhythm guitarist for the band Children of Bodom from 2003 to 2015 and the co-lead electric guitarist for Sinergy. He was also one of the founding members of Stone, which was one of the first notable bands in the history of Finnish heavy metal.

Biography
Latvala was born in Helsinki. At the age of 15, he founded the band Stone together with Janne Joutsenniemi. The band's style was initially focused on a more traditional heavy metal, but they soon shifted to a faster and more aggressive sound, which was the key for them to receive mass recognition. In the year of 1991, the band was dissolved, with a discography of four studio albums, one live album and one compilation album. He is the main influence of many Finnish guitarists, especially Alexi Laiho (from Children of Bodom).

After the breakup of Stone, he released an instrumental work with his brother, entitled Latvala bros. He then played with Dementia for around a year. In 1995 he joined Waltari after guitarist Sami Yli-Sirniö left the band. They played together for six years before Latvala decided to quit the band.

He joined Sinergy after vocalist Kimberly Goss moved from Sweden to Finland and had to reassemble the band, having assumed the role that previously belonged to Jesper Strömblad (from In Flames).

During the whole of his career, Latvala had many side projects and played as a guest musician in many bands, the most notable of the being: Warmen, Nomicon, Pornonorsu, Jailbreakers, Gloomy Grim, Amon Amarth, Children of Bodom, and Soulgrind. At times, he also composed movie soundtracks.

When Alexander Kuoppala left Children of Bodom in 2003 in the middle of their world tour, the members of the band were forced to search for a new guitarist in the time span of one month, when their next show would happen. The new guitarist needed to be able to learn about twenty songs to be played live. Alexi Laiho allegedly tried to recruit Kai R. Nergård, of the Norwegian Heavy metal band Griffin, who declined. With little time left, Latvala contacted Laiho and asked him if Children of Bodom needed any help on the tour. Laiho agreed that he would be a session player because he was the only guitarist he deemed skilled enough to manage the feat of learning the songs with enough accuracy to replace Kuoppala, who had been playing with the band for 10 years.

Latvala played the Moscow concert on 16 August successfully. Despite the initial announcement that he would be a session player only, he remained with the band and recorded the Trashed, Lost & Strungout EP. He continued playing with the band and also recorded the hit LP Are You Dead Yet?. Latvala played two guitar solos on the Children of Bodom album, "Are You Dead Yet?", despite the widely accepted notion that Laiho plays all solos on Bodom albums.

When he joined Children of Bodom, Latvala made a deal with ESP Guitars, which already endorsed Laiho and Henkka Seppälä. Before that he used Jackson Guitars almost exclusively (Latvala could be seen wearing the infamous Jackson T-shirt that reads Get The Best, Fuck The Rest), and it is not unusual for him to use his old Jacksons live.

There were rumors which said that he would switch sides with Jesper Strömblad of the melodic death metal Band In Flames, but he denied it saying that he had never heard anything about it, and added "I said that I like Dark Tranquillity and In Flames. But somebody misunderstood me and wrote silly things in a metal magazine. So we are together with my lovely friend Alexi Laiho and the whole crew."

As of late May 2015, Latvala no longer is a member of Children of Bodom with the band having recorded the I Worship Chaos album as a four-piece, he was later replaced by Finnish Swede guitarist Daniel Freyberg of Naildown and Norther. According to Latvala he was fired from Children of Bodom just days before recording for the album was about to start. He later stated that he felt like he was "stabbed in the back" by his former bandmates, while the band themselves said Latvala was not committed to the group, which included missing practices.

Guitars
On the Latvala Bros. Myspace page, it states that Latvala uses "metal plectrums." Latvala plays his ESP custom Random Star on stage and in the studio, yet he still, on some occasions, uses his old Jackson RR's.  These guitars have become highly famous among Finnish guitar players, and Latvala was instrumental in cementing Jackson Guitars as the best selling guitar brand in Finland.

ESP guitars released in early 2008 an LTD Roope Latvala signature guitar. It features an alder, Star shaped body, a neck-through maple neck with an ebony fretboard, cross inlays and reversed headstock. It includes an Original Floyd Rose bridge, Grover Tuners, a single EMG HZ H-2 bridge pickup with a single volume control. His signature guitar is discontinued in North America as of 2011. ESP produces an ESP comprised Roope Latvala signature series in Japan.

References

External links
Unofficial Roope Latvala Tribute Site – Contains brief biography, in-depth information on Roope's guitars and amplifiers, several photo galleries, discography, and a fan guestbook.

Rhythm guitarists
Musicians from Helsinki
Finnish heavy metal guitarists
Children of Bodom members
Living people
1970 births
Sinergy members